UFC Japan: Ultimate Japan  (also known as UFC Ultimate Japan or UFC 15.5) was a mixed martial arts event held by the Ultimate Fighting Championship on December 21, 1997 in Yokohama, Japan. The event was seen on pay per view in the United States, on cable TV in Japan, and was later released on home video.

History 
The event featured a four-man heavyweight tournament, the first ever UFC Middleweight Championship bout, a Heavyweight Championship bout, a Superfight and an alternate bout.  Ultimate Japan 1 featured the first UFC appearance of MMA legends Kazushi Sakuraba and Frank Shamrock.

The event was the first appearance of longtime UFC announcer Mike Goldberg, who replaced Bruce Beck as the play by play announcer. Another notable first was the use of unique entry music for each fighter, though this was not repeated in UFC 16. Also, this UFC event was the first to be located in a country other than the United States or its territories.

Sakuraba's Tale
In an attempt to gain attention for the Japanese Kingdom Pro Wrestling, Hiromitsu Kanehara and Yoji Anjo signed on to compete in the Ultimate Fighting Championship's Ultimate Japan tournament. As fate would have it, Kanehara was injured in his training for the tournament, and Kazushi Sakuraba wound up as his late hour substitute. The tournament was intended for heavyweights, and Sakuraba, at 183 pounds, was nearly twenty pounds beneath the UFC's 200 pound designation for the weight class. Reporting himself as 203 pounds in order to gain entry, Sakuraba was paired off against the 243 pound Brazilian jiu-jitsu blackbelt and former Extreme Fighting champion, Marcus Silveira.

Following a barrage of blows by Silveira, Sakuraba dropped for a low-single, only for the fight to be prematurely ended on a KO. Referee John McCarthy had mistakenly thought Sakuraba to have been knocked out. A loud protest followed from the crowd and an angry Sakuraba attempted unsuccessfully to take the microphone and address the Japanese audience. However, after reviewing tape, McCarthy changed his decision to a no-contest. Tank Abbott, who had earlier defeated Yoji Anjo, dropped from the tournament due to an injured hand, leaving Sakuraba and Silveira to face off once more that night in what would be the championship bout of the tournament. This time, Sakuraba claimed the victory, submitting Silveira with an armbar. Afterwards, Sakuraba famously stated, "In fact, professional wrestling is strong".

Results

UFC Japan Heavyweight Tournament bracket

1 Due to the NC, and Tank Abbott bowing out of the tournament, UFC officials ruled that a rematch between Sakuraba and Silveira would serve as the Heavyweight Tournament Finals.

See also 
 Ultimate Fighting Championship
 List of UFC champions
 List of UFC events
 1997 in UFC

References

External links
UFC Japan results at Sherdog.com

Ultimate Fighting Championship events
1997 in mixed martial arts
Mixed martial arts in Japan
Sport in Yokohama
1997 in Japanese sport